Johannessen is a Norwegian and Faroese patronymic surname. Notable people with the surname include:
Astrid Johannessen (born 1978),  Norwegian former football player who played for the Norway women's national football team
Bjørnar Johannessen (born 1977),  Norwegian football midfielder of Sparta Sarpsborg in the Norwegian First Division
Guri Johannessen (1911–1972),  Norwegian politician for the Labour Party
Herman Horn Johannessen (born 1964), Norwegian sailor and Olympic medalist
Johannes J. Johannessen, American Medal of Honor recipients
Leif Erlend Johannessen (born 1980),  Norwegian chess player, and Norway's fifth International Grandmaster
Martha Frederikke Johannessen (1907–1973),  Norwegian politician for the Labour Party
Maurice Johannessen,  American politician from California and a member of the Republican Party
Otto Johannessen (born 1894),  Norwegian gymnast who competed in the 1920 Summer Olympics
Pål Johannessen, Norwegian actor known for the role of Basse in the Norwegian Olsen Gang films
Sigge Johannessen (1884–1974),  Norwegian gymnast who competed in the 1908 Summer Olympics
Sigurd Halvorsen Johannessen (1881–1964), Norwegian acting councilor of state in 1940–1941 and a minister 1941–1942
Svein Johannessen (1937–2007),  Norwegian chess player
Trygve Johannessen (born 1953),  Norwegian former footballer
Ørjan Johannessen (born 1985), Norwegian chef, Bocuse d'Or Europe gold medallist
Viggo Johannessen (1936–2012), Norwegian civil servant

See also
Johannesen

Patronymic surnames
Norwegian-language surnames
Surnames from given names